Garbh Sgeir (Gaelic: 'rough skerry') is a rock about 100 metres west of the islet Òigh-sgeir, in the Small Isles, Lochaber, Scotland. There is an anchorage between the two.

It is not to be confused with the nearby islet of the same name that lies 400 m east of the southern tip of the island of Eigg, north of Eilean Chathastail.

The rock is home to a large colony of seabirds, and is protected by Scottish Natural Heritage.

References
 Haswell-Smith, Hamish (2004) The Scottish Islands. Edinburgh. Canongate.
 Murray, W.H. (1966) The Hebrides. London. Heinemann.

Small Isles, Lochaber
Skerries of Scotland
Islands of Highland (council area)